WCVS-FM (96.7 MHz) is a commercial FM radio station licensed to Virden, Illinois, and serving the Springfield metropolitan area.  It broadcasts an adult hits radio format, branded as "96.7 BOB FM."  The station is currently owned by Neuhoff Corp., through licensee Neuhoff Media Springfield, LLC.

WCVS-FM has an effective radiated power (ERP) of 6,000 watts.  The radio studios are on South 4th Street in Southern View, Illinois, using a Springfield address.  The transmitter is in Loami, Illinois, on Lead Line Road at Acorn Road.

History
The station signed on as WRVI on March 15, 1982.  It was the first station owned by Randal J. Miller whose company Virden Broadcasting owns 16 stations in the Midwest as of 2022.  On October 5, 1992, the station changed its call sign to the current WCVS-FM after WCVS relocated from 1450 AM to 96.7 FM following the purchase of the 96.7 FM frequency by Neuhoff Media. (1450 AM is now the home of co-owned WFMB, a sports radio station.) 

Following the change in call letters, WCVS-FM flipped formats to active rock, going by the name "The Rock @ 96-7".

On January 7, 2011, at midnight, WCVS-FM began stunting with all-Bruce Springsteen music. At noon, it changed formats to classic rock, branded as "96.7 The Boss". The first song on 96.7 The Boss was Takin' Me Back by the band Cheap Trick, founded in Rockford, Illinois.

On October 2, 2017, WCVS-FM changed its format to adult hits, branded as "96.7 BOB FM".

References

External links

CVS-FM
Bob FM stations
Adult hits radio stations in the United States